Lang-8.com is a language exchange social networking website geared towards language learners. The website is run by Lang-8 Inc., which is based in Tokyo, Japan. Currently, there are over 750,000 registered users spanning more than 190 countries and 90 languages.

History
Yangyang Xi, born in China and raised in Japan, conceived of Lang-8.com when he was 23 years old. At that time, he was a student at Kyoto University studying abroad in Shanghai, China. There, he kept a journal with his Chinese friends. Yangyang was studying Chinese and wrote entries in Chinese for his friends to correct. In return, his friends wrote entries in Yangyang's primary language (Japanese) for him to correct. This would be the catalyst for Lang-8.

In August 2006, Yangyang and classmate Kazuki Matsumoto created Lang-8.com as a research project. The program was limited to the students of Kyoto University. Between April and August 2007 the website was restructured and on June 29, 2007 YangYang Xi established the Lang-8 Inc. company.

In 2009, Yangyang and Kazuki had a falling out and Kazuki left the company. Yangyang is currently the CEO of the company.

In 2016, Lang-8 raised 200 million Yen.

Since February 2017, no new user registrations have been allowed. They say they originally planned to lift the suspension after 6 months. In March 2018 they finally extended the suspension without a specific end date. According to their blog post, this suspension is due to the fact that they are a small company so they do not have the resources to deal with spammers and bots that have been abusing the platform, and to work on the Lang-8 app and its sister service HiNative simultaneously.

Features

Features common to all accounts

Users are able to post in the language(s) they are learning and that post will appear to native speakers of that language for correction. Users are limited to two learning languages.
Users can also correct posts written in their native language. The correction feature includes things such as color coding, bold, and strikethrough.

Premium account features

Entries posted by premium account members are given priority display which increases the likelihood of receiving a correction.
Other premium account features include the ability to add images to entries, download PDF versions of entries/corrections, add an unlimited number of learning languages, hide advertisements, perform personal journal searches, customize the background with images, and make suggestions to improve correction entry.

Community
As of December 2013, the website has over 750,000 registered members and continues to experience solid growth. However, users have been unable to register and are redirected to their other service, HiNative, which had about 240,000 users by the end of September 2016, since March 2017.

The user base is made up of people from over 190 countries, speaking around 90 different languages. The primary user base is Japanese, with approximately 30% of users originating from Japan.

Awards
In 2009, Lang-8.com received the Wish2009 IT Media Award with notable recognition for marketability. The Wish2009 is an event that showcases innovative startup web services.

References

Official help section of lang-8.com
The secret language of online study by Harvey Beasley – Jselect magazine vol 36. No3
Lang-8 puts networking onto a linguistic level By Kendall Manlove
A review on TechCrunch by Serkan Toto on May 23, 2009

Multilingual websites
Social networking language-learning websites
Japanese educational websites
Language exchange programs